The following is a list of notable deaths in May 2005.

Entries for each day are listed alphabetically by surname. A typical entry lists information in the following sequence:
 Name, age, country of citizenship at birth, subsequent country of citizenship (if applicable), reason for notability, cause of death (if known), and reference.

May 2005

1
Edgar Baird, 93, Canadian businessman.
Rex Bergstrom, 79, New Zealand econometrician.
Kenneth B. Clark, 90, African-American civil rights activist and psychologist.
René Rivkin, 60, Australian stockbroker.
Edward von Kloberg III, 63, American lobbyist.

2
Renée Faure, 86, French actress.
Robert Hunter, 63, Canadian journalist and co-founder of Greenpeace.
Wee Kim Wee, 89, Singaporean politician, fourth President of Singapore from 1985 to 1993, prostate cancer.
Theofiel Middelkamp, 91, Dutch cyclist, first Dutchman to win a stage in the Tour de France and first Dutch world champion.
Jack Nichols, 67, American gay rights activist, cancer.
Börje Nyberg, 85, Swedish actor and film director.
John C. Pritzlaff Jr., 79, American politician and diplomat.
Raisa Struchkova, 79, Russian dancer and People's Artist of the USSR.

3
Henriette, Lady Abel Smith, 90, British courtier, lady-in-waiting to Queen Elizabeth II.
Jagjit Singh Aurora, 89, Indian army general.
David Batchelor, 63, British sound mixer.
George S. Bowman Jr., 93, United States Marine Corps officer and Naval aviator.
Don Canham, 87, American track and field athlete, former University of Michigan athletic director.
Bobby Forrest, 73, English footballer.
Michel Maurice-Bokanowski, 92, French politician.
Pierre Moerlen, 52, French drummer and percussionist.
Willi Steffen, 80, Swiss football player.

4
Mark Boyle, 70, Scottish artist.
Purwoto Gandasubrata, 75, Chief Justice of the Supreme Court of Indonesia.
David Hackworth, 74, American Vietnam War veteran, journalist.
Michael Kernan, 78, American author and journalist.
Joyce Lambert, 88, British botanist and ecologist, bronchopneumonia.
Evelyn Lutman Roberts, 88, American wife of preacher Oral Roberts.
Neal Pattman, 79, American electric blues harmonica player, singer and songwriter, bone cancer.
Luis Taruc, 91, Filipino Communist revolutionary figure, leader of the HUKBALAHAP, a guerrilla group against the Japanese during World War II.
Don Trachte, 89, American cartoonist.

5
Ted Atkinson, 88, Canadian-born American Hall of Fame jockey.
Carolyn Brady, 67, American artist.
Donald Brian Doe, 84, British archaeologist and architect.
Elisabeth Fraser, 85, American actress (The Phil Silvers Show, A Patch of Blue, One Happy Family).
June MacCloy, 96, American actress.
Skip Minisi, 78, American football player.
Magdolna Nyári-Kovács, 83, Hungarian Olympic fencer.
Édgar Ponce, 30, Mexican actor, collision between car and motorcycle during filming of video for "Sólo para mujeres".

6
Theodore J. Bauer, 95, American specialist in infectious diseases.
Luis Cabellero, 42, Paraguayan footballer.
Miguel Contreras, 52, American labor union leader.
Rafael Díaz-Balart, 79, Cuban politician, opponent and former brother-in-law of Fidel Castro, father of U.S. Congressmen Lincoln Díaz-Balart and Mario Díaz-Balart.
Joe Grant, 96, American animator and screenwriter (Fantasia, Alice in Wonderland, Pocahontas), heart attack.
Jost Gross, 59, Swiss politician, member of the National Council.
Earl Richmond, 43, American serial killer, execution by lethal injection.
Lisa Freeman Roberts, 56, American vocalist.
Herb Sargent, 81, American television comedy writer.
Lee Stine, 91, American baseball player, who pitched in Major League Baseball for the Chicago White Sox, Cincinnati Reds and New York Yankees.

7
Václav Boštík, 91, Czech artist.
Tristan Egolf, 33, American author, suicide.
Ray Hamann, 93, American basketball player and coach.
Peter W. Rodino, 95, American politician and chairman of the House Judiciary Committee during the impeachment process against Richard Nixon.
Otilino Tenorio, 25, Ecuadorian international football player, automobile accident.

8
Rafiqul Bari Chowdhury, Bangladeshi cinematographer and director.
Wolfgang Blochwitz, 64, German footballer.
Lloyd Cutler, 87, American attorney, former White House Counsel under Presidents Carter and Clinton.
Nasrat Parsa, 37, Afghan singer, murdered abroad.
A. J. Shepherd, 78, American ex-Indianapolis 500 racing driver.
Nino Terzo, 81, Italian actor.
Don Youngblood, 51, American IFBB professional bodybuilder, heart attack.

9
Billa Harrod, 93, British writer and architectural conservationist.
Ang Kiukok, 74, Filipino painter.
Sir Charles Morrison, 72, British landowner and Conservative politician.
Akihiko Saito, 44, Japanese hostage in Iraq.
Tiny Wharton, 77, British football referee.

10
Philip Agustin, Filipino publisher and editor.
Hal Griggs, 76, American baseball player (Washington Senators).
Veikko Hursti, 80, Finnish philanthropist.
Jim Love, 78, American sculptor.
Jay Marshall, 85, American magician and ventriloquist, dean of the Society of American Magicians.
David Wayne, 47, American singer of the heavy metal group Metal Church.

11
Léo Cadieux, 96, Canadian politician and diplomat.
Alfred Finnigan, 108, Welsh centenarian, oldest man in Wales and World War I survivor.
Michalis Genitsaris, 86, Greek rebetiko singer and composer.
Bob Stuart, 84, New Zealand rugby player.
Percy Trezise, 82, Australian painter, writer and explorer.

12
Carl Alpert, 92, American-born Israeli journalist.
Maurice "The Matador" Catarcio, 76, American former World Wrestling Entertainment (WWE) wrestler, cancer.
Sara Gadimova, 82, Azerbaijani khananda singer.
Evaristo Iglesias, 79, Cuban Olympic sprinter.
Ömer Kavur, 60, Turkish film director, producer, and screenwriter, lymphoma.
Martin Lings, 96, English writer, scholar, philosopher and arabist.
Monica Zetterlund, 67, Swedish singer and actress.

13
Eddie Barclay, 84, French record producer and founder of Barclay Records.
George Dantzig, 90, American mathematician, "father of linear programming".
Hugh Montefiore, 85, English Bishop of Birmingham and environmental activist with Friends of the Earth.
Próspero Penados del Barrio, 79, Guatemalan Roman Catholic prelate, Archbishop of Guatemala City.
Michael Ross, 45, American convicted serial killer, executed by lethal injection.

14
Michael Carson, 57, Australian television director.
Jimmy Martin, 77, American bluegrass singer.
Helvecio Martins, 74, Brazilian LDS leader.
Tibor Šalát, 79, Slovak mathematician.
Mary Treadgold, 95, English author, literary editor and BBC producer, cancer.

15
Povl Ahm, 78, Danish engineer, cancer.
Vakha Arsanov, Chechen warlord and vice president of the Chechen Republic of Ichkeria, killed.
Anthony Ashley-Cooper, 11th Earl of Shaftesbury, 27, English peer, suspected heart attack.
Les Bartley, 51, Canadian former coach of the Toronto Rock of the National Lacrosse League, colon cancer.
Alan B. Gold, 88, Canadian retired Chief Justice of the Quebec Superior Court, negotiated an end to the Oka standoff and numerous strikes.
Natalya Gundareva, 56, Russian actress, stroke.
Bob Haak, 79, Dutch art expert and founder of the Rembrandt Research Project.
Aulis Kallakorpi, 76, Finnish ski jumper, Olympic silver medalist (1956).
Mahipal, 86, Indian film actor, cardiac arrest.

16
L. Bruce Archer, 82, British mechanical engineer and designer.
Sir Rees Davies, 66, Welsh historian.
Dale Erdahl, 73, American businessman and politician.
Andrew J. Goodpaster, 90, American Army general, former leader of NATO and veteran of World War II.
June Lang, 90, American actor.
Jose M. Lopez, 94, Mexican US Army soldier, Medal of Honor-winning soldier in World War II.
Albert "Smiler" Marshall, 108, British veteran of World War I.
Arthur Naftalin, 87, American politician, former mayor of Minneapolis, Minnesota.
Jiří Rubáš, 83, Czech football player and manager.

17
Keiiti Aki, 75, Japanese seismologist.
Ellis Batten Page, 81, American educational psychologist.
Luc-Peter Crombé, 85, Belgian painter.
Piero Dorazio, 77, Italian painter.
Frank Gorshin, 71, American actor (Batman, 12 Monkeys, That Darn Cat!), cancer.
Abrarul Haq Haqqi, 84, Indian Sunni Muslim scholar.
Elsa Hilger, 101, American cellist.

18
Gergely Pongrátz, 73, Hungarian anti-communist.
Shaima Rezayee, 24, Afghan TV presenter of Hop, an Afghan programme similar to MTV.
Bobby Thompson, 67, American banjoist (Area Code 615).
Whayne Wilson, 29, Costa Rican footballer.
Denis Wright, 94, British diplomat, prostate cancer.
Bob Wynn, 65, American golfer, lung cancer.
Stella Zázvorková, 83, Czech actress.

19
John Arthur, 85, South African boxer.
Richard Cartwright, 31, American convicted murderer, executed by lethal injection.
Henry Corden, 85, Canadian voice actor (The Flintstones, The Ten Commandments, Johnny Quest), emphysema.
Batya Gur, 57, Israeli author, lung cancer.
Richard Lewine, 94, American Broadway composer and TV producer.
Victor Wouk, 86, American scientist and electrical engineer.

20
Anthony Athanas, 93, Albanian-born American restaurateur.
J. D. Cannon, 83, American actor (McCloud, Cool Hand Luke, Raise the Titanic).
Marian Foik, 71, Polish Olympic sprinter.
Harriet White Medin, 91, American actress (Death Race 2000, The Horrible Dr. Hichcock, The Terminator).
Paul Ricœur, 92, French philosopher and teacher.
Lujo Tončić-Sorinj, 90, Austrian diplomat and politician, former Foreign Minister of Austria.

21
Monica Charlot, 81, British historian and political scientist.
Stephen Elliott, 86, American actor (Arthur, Beverly Hills Cop, Dallas).
Bedford Jezzard, 77, English footballer, former Fulham F.C. football player and manager.
David Lang, 37, American football player, former NFL running back with the Los Angeles Rams and Dallas Cowboys.
Howard Morris, 85, American voice actor (The Flintstones, Garfield and Friends, Police Academy).
Subodh Mukherjee, 84, Indian filmmaker.
Fred Rosen, 74, American physician.

22
Terry Carisse, 62, Canadian singer-songwriter.
Charilaos Florakis, 91, Greek politician, honorary president and former secretary general (1972–1989) of the Communist Party of Greece.
Julia Randall, 81, American poet.
Thurl Ravenscroft, 91, American voice actor (Tony the Tiger, How the Grinch Stole Christmas!).
John Rothwell, 91, Australian cricketer.

23
John Albano, 82, American comic book writer (Jonah Hex).
Hugh Cabot III, 75, American artist.
Sígfrid Gràcia, 73, Spanish footballer.
Derek Ratcliffe, 75, British conservationist.
Billy Smart, Jr, 71, British circus impresario.
Roderick Wright, 64, Scottish Roman Catholic bishop, disgraced and renounced the office of bishop.

24
Carl Amery, 83, German writer.
Arthur Haulot, 91, Belgian journalist, member of the resistance during World Waa II.
Robert McAuliffe, 66, Trinidadian-born Olympic sports shooter for the United States Virgin Islands.
Dick Raikes, 93, British Royal Navy officer.
Saeed Khan Rangeela, 68, Pakistani actor, singer and director.

25
Sunil Dutt, 75, Indian Bollywood actor and Union Minister, India.
Robert Jankel, 67, British limousine designer.
Graham Kennedy, 71, Australian TV celebrity and comedian.
Vera Komarkova, 62, Czech-American mountaineer and botanist, complications of breast cancer treatment.
Ruth Laredo, 67, American pianist.
Steve Mason, 65, American poet and war veteran.
Ismail Merchant, 68, Indian-born film producer.
Zoran Mušič, 96, Slovene painter, graphic artist and draughtsman.
Domenic Troiano, 59, Canadian guitarist, cancer.

26
Eddie Albert, 99, American actor (Roman Holiday, Green Acres, The Heartbreak Kid)
Albinas Albertynas, 71, Lithuanian politician.
John Hope Anderson, 93, American politician.
Charles Bouvet, 86, French Olympic pole vaulter.
James G. Butler, 84, American lawyer.
Chico Carrasquel, 77, Venezuelan shortstop, the first Latin American player to appear in an MLB All-Star game.
Israel Epstein, 90, Polish-Chinese communist journalist and author.
Sangoulé Lamizana, 89, Burkinabe politician, former president of Burkina Faso.
Krzysztof Nowak, 29, Polish football player for VfL Wolfsburg and the Polish national team, ALS.
Radius Prawiro, 76, Indonesian economist and politician, Minister of Finance.
Jim Ray, 60, American baseball player.
Terry Shannon, 52, American IT expert.
Dale Velzy, 77,  American surfboard shaper.

27
Abuzar Aydamirov, 71, Chechen writer.
Morris Cohen, 93, American metallurgist.
Fay Godwin, 74, British photographer.
Terje Johanssen, 62, Norwegian poet.
Ian Mackenzie-Kerr, 75, British book designer.

28
Emil Appolus, 70, Namibian politician.
Benjamin Biaggini, 89, American railroad executive.
Clair A. Callan, 85, American politician, U.S. Representative from Nebraska (1965–1967).
John Sidney Garrett, 83, American politician, member of the Louisiana House of Representatives.
Arnold Morton, 83, American restaurateur, founder of Morton's of Chicago steakhouses.
David Oswald Thomas, 81, Welsh philosopher.

29
Ricky Allen, 70, American blues singer.
María de los Ángeles Alvariño González, 88, Spanish oceanographer.
Oscar Brown, Jr., 78, American musician, playwright, activist.
Patsy Calton, 56, British Liberal Democrat Member of Parliament, cancer.
Joseph Karth, 82, American politician, U.S. Representative from Minnesota (1959–1977).
Hamilton Naki, 78, South African surgeon.
Sir Frederick Page, 88, British aircraft designer.
Svatopluk Pluskal, 74, Czechoslovak footballer.
George Rochberg, 86, American composer.
Sir Gordon Tait, 83, British admiral.

30
Takanohana Kenshi, (née Mitsuru Hanada), 55, Japanese sumo wrestler, aka "The Prince of Sumo".
Jan Knappert, 78, Dutch linguist.
Fazal Mahmood, 78, Pakistani cricket captain.
Tomasz Pacyński, 47, Polish fantasy and science fiction author.
Herbert Warren Wind, 88, American sportswriter.
Alma Ziegler, 87, American baseball player (All-American Girls Professional Baseball League).

31
Sir John Aiken, 83, British air marshal.
Emily Blatch, Baroness Blatch, 67, British politician and life peer.
Archil Gomiashvili, 79, Soviet Georgian actor.
Yuri Kleschev, 74, Soviet volleyball coach, referee and writer.
Harry Larche, 81, American football player and coach.
Jaime Mendoza-Nava, 79, Bolivian-American composer and conductor.
Grisélidis Réal, 75, Swiss writer and sex worker, cancer.
Eduardo Teixeira Coelho, 86, Portuguese comic book artist.

References

2005-05
 05